Thomas Willis (born 4 November 1983 in Sydney, New South Wales, Australia) is an Australian goalkeeper.

In his position as goalkeeper, Willis started 15 games for Roar in the 2005–06 season, making 51 saves and recording 6 cleansheets. He represented Australia at the 2003 FIFA World Youth Championship.

References

1983 births
Living people
Soccer players from Sydney
A-League Men players
Association football goalkeepers
Australian soccer players
Brisbane Roar FC players